Bertrice Small (December 9, 1937 – February 24, 2015), was an American New York Times- bestselling writer of historical and erotic romance novels. Bertrice lived on Long Island, New York, with her husband George Small. She was a member of The Authors Guild, Romance Writers of America, PAN, and PASIC.

Biography

Personal life

Small was born Bertrice Williams in Manhattan on December 9, 1937. Her parents were David Williams and the former Doris Steen. Both worked in the business side of television broadcasting. She attended St. Mary's, a school for girls run by Anglican nuns in Peekskill, N.Y. She later entered Western College for Women in Ohio but dropped out and transferred to a Katherine Gibbs secretarial school, after which she worked as a secretary in advertising agencies.
 
She was married for 49 years to George Small, who died in 2012. They had a son, Thomas, and 4 grandchildren. She had lived on eastern Long Island for 30 years.

Small died on February 24, 2015, aged 77, in Southold, New York.

She is survived by her son Thomas, and her four grandchildren; Chandler, Cora, Sophia, and Evan.

Writing career
From 1978 on, Small authored over 50 novels, including in the historical romance, fantasy romance and erotic contemporary genres. Her novels included The Kadin, and the series The O'Malley Saga and Skye's Legacy.

A New York Times bestselling author, Small also appeared on other best-seller lists including Publishers Weekly, USA Today and the Los Angeles Times. She was the recipient of numerous awards including Best Historical Romance, Outstanding Historical Romance Series, Career Achievement for Historical Fantasy and several Reviewers Choice awards from Romantic Times. She had a "Silver Pen" from Affaire de Coeur, and an Honorable Mention from The West Coast Review of Books. In 2004 Bertrice Small was awarded a Lifetime Achievement Award by Romantic Times magazine for her contributions to the genre.

Bibliography

Leslie Family Saga Series
The Kadin,	1978
Love Wild and Fair,	1978

Single Novels
Adora,	1980
Unconquered,	1981
Beloved,	1983
Enchantress Mine,	1987
The Spitfire,	1990
A Moment in Time,	1991
To Love Again,	1993
Love, Remember Me	1994
The Love Slave,	1995
Hellion,	1996
Betrayed,	1998
Deceived,	1998
The Innocent,	1999
A Memory of Love,	2000
The Duchess,	2001
The Dragon Lord's Daughters,	2004

The Border Chronicles
A Dangerous Love, 2006
The Border Lord's Bride, 2007
The Captive Heart, 2008
The Border Lord and Lady, 2009
The Border Vixen, 2010
Bond of Passion, 2011

O'Malley Family Saga Series
Skye O'Malley, 1981
All the Sweet Tomorrows,	1984
A Love for All Time,	1986
This Heart of Mine,	1988
Lost Love Found,	1989
Wild Jasmine,	1992

Wyndham Family Saga Series
Blaze Wyndham,	1988
Love, Remember Me,	1994

Skye's Legacy Series
Darling Jasmine,	1997
Bedazzled,	1999
Besieged,	2001
Intrigued,	2001
Just Beyond Tomorrow,	2002
Vixens,	2003

Friarsgate Inheritance Saga Series
Rosamund,	2002
Until you,	2003
Philippa,	2004
The Last Heiress,	2005

Pleasure Channel Series
Private Pleasures,	2004
Forbidden Pleasure, 2006
Sudden Pleasures, 2007
Dangerous Pleasures, 2008
Passionate Pleasures, 2010
Guilty Pleasures, 2011

World of Hetar Series
Lara,	2005
A Distant Tomorrow, 2006
The Twilight Lord, 2007
The Sorceress of Belmair, 2008
The Shadow Queen, 2009
Crown of Destiny, 2010

The Silk Merchants Daughters
Bianca, 2012
Francesca, 2013
Lucianna, 2013
Serena (as yet unpublished)

Anthologies in collaboration
"Ecstasy" in CAPTIVATED,	1999 (with Thea Devine, Susan Johnson and Robin Schone)
"Mastering Lady Lucinda" in FASCINATED,	2000 (with Thea Devine, Susan Johnson and Robin Schone)
"The Awakening" in DELIGHTED,	2002 (with Nikki Donovan, Susan Johnson and Liz Madison)
"Zuleika and the Barbarian" in I LOVE ROGUES,	2003 (with Jane Bonander and Thea Devine)

References

Sources

Bertrice Small's author page on Historical Romance Writers
Bertrice Small in Fantastic Fiction
Interview with Bertrice Small on Veronika Asks

1937 births
2015 deaths
20th-century American novelists
21st-century American novelists
American romantic fiction writers
American women novelists
20th-century American women writers
21st-century American women writers